Kingswood House School is a private school in Epsom, Surrey in the United Kingdom.  It was founded in 1899 and moved to its present site in West Hill in 1920.  In September 2021 it opened its doors to girls and became co-educational from Reception to GCSE (16 years). The School is a member of the Independent Association of Preparatory Schools (IAPS) and Society of Heads - with a current roll of approximately 250 pupils. Popular destinations for its leavers each year are Epsom College, St. John's School, Leatherhead, and City of London Freemen's School. One of the unique traditions upon leaving Kingswood House School, is each leaver may engrave their name on a brick on the outside of the main school building. The School holds a number of Open Mornings throughout the year - in February, May and October. In 2016, the school added a new Senior Department, for boys aged 13 to 16. In 2018, the school started work on a new planned senior block to be completed by September. The building was officially opened in March 2019 with the building being named after former headmaster, Peter Brooks. The DT Room had a refit in Autumn 2019 and a new Astro turf and teaching hub were completed in September 2021 alongside enhanced facilities for girls now attending the school. A 'Finalist' in prestigious Independent School of the Year Awards 2021 (awaiting results...)

In addition to the sporting life of the school, pupils compete in external competitions.

The school took part in a national competition for environmental problem solving sponsored by the World Wide Fund for Nature

Heads

 Revd Sandberg
 Mr Dixon
 Mr Morley-Tabor
 Mr Malden
 Mr William (Bill) H Thorne
 Mr Christopher Scott-Malden (Mr Chris)
 Mr Mark Harvey
 Mr Peter Brooks
 Mr Duncan Murphy

Notable alumni

Quentin Crisp
Cecil Gould
Richard Rogers, architect.
Nicholas Witchell

External links
School website

References

Private schools in Surrey
 
1899 establishments in England
Educational institutions established in 1899
Epsom